Yun-hui, also spelled Yoon-hee or Yun-hee, is a Korean unisex given name. Its meaning differs based on the hanja used to write each syllable of the name. There are 16 hanja with the reading "yoon" and 24 hanja with the reading "hee" on the South Korean government's official list of hanja which may be used in given names.

People
People with this name include:

Entertainers
Jeong Yun-hui (born 1954), South Korean actress
Yu Ji-in (born Lee Yun-hui, 1956), South Korean actress
Jo Yoon-hee (born 1982), South Korean actress
Ri Yun-hui, North Korean drummer, member of Moranbong Band

Sportspeople
Chang Yoon-hee (born 1970), South Korean volleyball player
Choi Yun-hui (born 1967), South Korean swimmer
Lee Yun-hui (born 1980), South Korean volleyball player
Chung Yun-hee (born 1984), South Korean long-distance runner and marathon race specialist
Seo Yoon-hee (born 1984), South Korean badminton player
Choi Yun-hee (born 1986), South Korean pole vaulter
Lee Yun-hui (rower) (born 1986), South Korean rower

Other
Younhee Yang (born 1977), South Korean painter

Fictional characters
Fictional characters with this name include:
Kim Yoon-hee, in 2010 South Korean television series Sungkyunkwan Scandal
Cha Yoon-hee, in 2012 South Korean television series My Husband Got a Family
Seo Yoon-hee, in 2012 South Korean film The Tower
Kim Yoon-hee, in 2012 South Korean television series Love Rain
Oh Yoon-hee, in 2020 South Korean television series The Penthouse: War in Life

See also
List of Korean given names

References

Korean unisex given names